"De Janeiro" is the debut single by German dance music group R.I.O. The song was written by Gottfried Engels, Ramon Zenker and Airto Moreira. It was released in the Netherlands as a digital download on 19 November 2007.

Track listing
Digital download
 "De Janeiro" (Radio Edit) – 2:42
 "De Janeiro" (S&H Project Remix) – 6:16
 "De Janeiro" (Micha Moor Remix) – 6:13
 "De Janeiro" – 6:22

Credits and personnel
Producers – Yann Peifer, Manuel Reuter
Lyrics – Gottfried Engels, Ramon Zenker, Airto Moreira
Label: Spinnin' Records

Charts

Release history

References

2007 songs
2007 debut singles
R.I.O. songs
Songs written by Ramon Zenker
Techno instrumentals
Spinnin' Records singles
Songs about Rio de Janeiro (city)